Bob Berryhill (born December 15, 1947) was a member of The Surfaris and co-writer and recording artist of "Wipe Out" and other Surfaris' hits. In 1960, when Berryhill was 13, he took a trip to the Hawaiian Islands and learned to surf and play ukulele. On returning to California, he began working seriously on guitar and two years later, "Wipe Out" was born. His role of rhythm guitar merged into lead guitar later with his new band, The Surfaris featuring Bob Berryhill.

Wipeout, was inducted into the Musicians Hall of Fame and Museum in 2019.

Bob Berryhill said:
"Ronnie [Wilson] loved Scottish marches and sometimes played with our high school Tartan marching band. That came into play coupled with my suggestion of bongo rock-type breaks for an arrangement, a drum-solo type of song with a simple guitar melody. Ronnie started playing the famous Wipe Out solo and in about ten minutes we had the song together."

References

External links
The Surfaris official Facebook page
The Surfaris official site
The Surfaris official MySpace site
Bob Berryhill Interview NAMM Oral History Library (2011)

1947 births
Living people
American rock guitarists
American male guitarists
Lead guitarists
Surf musicians
The Surfaris members
Place of birth missing (living people)
20th-century American guitarists
20th-century American male musicians